Deydier is a surname. Notable people with the surname include:

 Anthony Deydier (1788–1864), French priest, missionary, and teacher
 Brigitte Deydier (born 1958), French judoka

French-language surnames